The 1969 Tipperary Senior Hurling Championship was the 79th staging of the Tipperary Senior Hurling Championship since its establishment by the Tipperary County Board in 1887.

Roscrea were the defending champions.

On 26 October 1969, Roscrea won the championship after a 4–13 to 0–05 defeat of Carrick Davins in the final at Thurles Sportsfield. It was their second championship title overall and their second title in succession.

Results

Final

References

Tipperary
Tipperary Senior Hurling Championship